Rosecrance is a provider of behavioral health services with addiction treatment programs. Rosecrance serves clients at locations across Illinois, Wisconsin and Iowa.

Rosecrance provides treatment services for individuals with substance abuse and mental health disorders, including residential treatment with an emphasis on co-occurring substance abuse and mental health disorders and specialty residential programs for adolescents and young adults facing mood and anxiety disorders or trauma. Residential treatment is supported by additional services including detoxification, recovery homes, veterans’ programs, prevention and early intervention programs, criminal justice and specialty court programs, and alumni services. Mental health services extend beyond outpatient treatment with supportive housing and crisis services.

History 
In 1864, Dr. James and Frannie Rosecrance built a 16-room white house in New Milford, Illinois. First erected as a clinic for Civil War soldiers, the structure switched focus to youth and families by the late 1800s. The Rosecrances left provisions in their wills to turn the house into the Rosecrance Memorial Home for Children on Aug. 11, 1916. The home operated as an orphanage for boys until the early 1950s.

Rosecrance has grown from serving 12 to 18 boys in 1916 to more than 37,000 clients annually (37,024 clients served in fiscal year 2018).

In 1995, Rosecrance opened a $5.3 million, 76-bed adult treatment center in Rockford.

In early 2004, it opened the $14 million, 78-bed Rosecrance Griffin Williamson Campus to treat adolescents.

In early 2010, Rosecrance merged with the Janet Wattles Center and its subsidiaries.

In July 2016, Community Elements merged into Rosecrance in Champaign, Illinois.

In January 2018, Prairie Center merged into Rosecrance in central Illinois.

Rosecrance announced an affiliation with Jackson Recovery Centers in January 2019.

References 

Mental health organizations in Illinois
Addiction organizations in the United States
Organizations established in 1916